Shikō, Shiko or Shikou (written: 志功 or 紫紅) is a masculine Japanese given name. Notable people with the name include:

 (1880–1916), Japanese artist
 (1903–1975), Japanese printmaker and painter

Japanese masculine given names